La caverne is the fourth studio album by the Quebec indie rock band Malajube, released on April 13, 2011.

The album was a longlisted nominee for the 2011 Polaris Music Prize and won the 2012 Juno Award for Francophone Album of the Year.

Music videos
Music videos have been released for "Synesthésie" and "Le blizzard".

Track listing

References

2011 albums
Malajube albums
Bravo Musique albums
Juno Award for Francophone Album of the Year albums